Bernard Lewis (born 10 February 1926) is the English entrepreneur behind the River Island fashion brand and clothing chain.

Early life
He was born on 10 February 1926, and educated at the Jewish Free School, and Northern Polytechnic Institute. He helped in his parents’ greengrocer as a child and from that experience gained skills like learning how to price stock, understand what customers wanted and reduce waste. He served in the RAF from 1944 to 1945.

Career
Lewis opened his first fruit and vegetable shop in the North London area (on Holloway Road) at the age of 20  and began selling clothing, primarily blouses and skirts, then dresses, in the 1940s.  His first clothes shop was in Mare Street, Hackney.

During the 1970s, he launched a chain of clothing stores, later called Chelsea Girl.

Lewis also founded Lewis Separates.

He founded the Lewis Trust Group with his elder brother David and younger brother Geoffrey, but the latter two left in 1977.

Lewis is estimated to be worth £1,030m (€1,484m). In 2015, he was at position 83 on the Sunday times Rich List.

River Island is now run by his nephew, Ben Lewis.

Personal life
His "right-hand man in the 1970s" was Leonard, his elder son from his first marriage. In 1968, he married Jennifer Oldham, née Johnston, who modeled and acted under the name Jenny Meredith. She died in 1975.

In 1981, he married Vanessa Bracey who had been a buyer for Chelsea Girl since 1970, and whom he had been in a relationship with since 1972. They have two sons, Sam and Jacob.

References

Living people
1926 births
English Jews
People from the City of London
British billionaires
English businesspeople in fashion
People educated at JFS (school)
Conservative Party (UK) donors